The swallowtail shiner (Notropis procne) is a North American  species of freshwater fish in the family Cyprinidae. The shiner has a pale yellow back with a blue stripe on its silver side. It also has a silvery white belly. Its fins are yellowish and it has a dorsal fin originating above the back half of the pelvic fin base and a tail fin with a black spot at its base. When viewed from above, two pigmented stripes are visible near the dorsal fin: one predorsally and the postdorsally. Its snout is either slightly pointed or slightly rounded. The swallowtail shiner lives in warm creeks and in river pools. 

It is known to live in Atlantic drainages from New York to South Carolina. It may have been introduced to the New River system in Virginia, although it is possible that it is native there. It may have spread via canals into tributaries of Lake Ontario. It is often found near plants. The shiner eats insects, worms, mites, microcrustaceans, and algae. Fecundity is unknown in this species and it breeds well in aquariums. It is similar to the closely related Cape Fear shiner and sand shiner.

Taxonomy
There are two subspecies of swallowtail shiner: Notropis procne procne and N. procne longiceps (Cope, 1868).  The nominate subspecies is found in the Delaware River and Susquehanna Rivers south to the James River in Virginia.  N. procne longiceps is found from the Roanoke River in Virginia to the Santee River in South Carolina.

References 

 
 

Notropis
Fish described in 1865